"I Take Thee Quagmire" is the 21st episode of season four of Family Guy, originally broadcast March 12, 2006 on Fox. Peter wins free maid service for a week; he intentionally creates extra work for the maid, Joan. Quagmire meets her and instantly falls in love with her, leading him to propose to her after the second date. After the marriage, Quagmire comes to regret his new relationship, but learns that Joan will kill him and herself if he leaves her, so he fakes his own death.

The episode was written by Tom Maxwell, Don Woodard and Steve Callaghan and directed by Seth Kearsley. It received mostly positive reviews from critics for its storyline and many cultural references. According to Nielsen ratings, it was viewed in 8.06 million homes in its original airing. The episode featured guest performances by Adam Carolla, Stephan Cox, Bryan Cranston, Darrel Heath, Beth Littleford, Christy Carlson Romano, Nicole Sullivan, Fred Tatasciore, Alex Thomas, and Alex Trebek, as well as several recurring voice actors for the series.

Plot
Peter is a contestant on Wheel of Fortune, advances to the bonus round, and wins, despite choosing Z, 4, three Qs, and the Batman symbol for his consonants and vowel, and taking a self-described "shot in the dark" with his answer, "Alex Karras in Webster", managing to get the correct answer on his first try, to Pat Sajak's absolute shock (whom Peter believes is Regis Philbin). He chooses, among several other prizes, one week of free maid service. When his maid Joan arrives, Peter has her pull items out of his belly button (including, among other things, a ColecoVision set and a carton of Parliament Cigarettes), and rides on her back, like a horse, to the store. Peter decides to over-work Joan on her last night by giving Meg a watermelon filled with chocolate pudding and M-80 firecrackers, which explodes in her face. After being introduced to her by Peter, Quagmire falls in love with her. After dating Joan, Quagmire proposes marriage to her, which she accepts and the couple prepare their marriage ceremony. Lois, Peter and their neighbors visit Quagmire's house, finding that he has changed his personality significantly. Peter still believes this to be a prank and shows Quagmire porn magazines in an attempt to change him back to his former ways. Meanwhile, Lois begins to question whether she should keep breastfeeding Stewie, as he is hurting her when feeding.

By the time of Quagmire's wedding, Lois' breasts have gotten very large after deciding to wean Stewie, on the advice of Brian. While at the reception, the top of her shirt rips open. Peter notices that Quagmire is staring at Lois' huge breasts, and deliberately spills champagne on them. Peter then "helps" Lois by shaking her, which makes her large breasts jiggle. This arouses Quagmire, and he realizes that he has made a mistake by marrying Joan. He informs Joan that some of his friends think they should get an annulment after discussing it with Peter, Joe and Cleveland, but she threatens to cut herself and him if he annuls their marriage. As a result, Peter decides to help Quagmire fake his death. He shows Joan a video of Quagmire being attacked by a ninja (Joe), a Nazi (Cleveland), a "pots and pans" robot (Peter), and the body being consumed by a dinosaur held by Peter (to the theme of Jurassic Park). Joan is unconvinced by the video. Peter and his friends then operate plan B, which consists of Quagmire pretending to suffer a heart attack and die. Quagmire is buried in a coffin with enough oxygen to last him a short period of time so Peter can return after the funeral has finished and dig him up. However, when Mayor West announces that all coffins must be buried in concrete (to guard against zombies), Peter exclaims that Quagmire is not dead, and brings him out of the coffin, alive. Death shows up to retrieve his body. Joan pleads for Quagmire's life, and grabs Death by the arm, causing her to drop dead instantly. Peter talks Death into taking Joan instead, as "she was suicidal and her last name was Quagmire." However, before he leaves, Quagmire asks Death to leave the body for another five minutes, thus turning him back into his old usual self.

Meanwhile, Stewie has been having drug-like withdrawals since Lois decided to wean him. He becomes so desperate that when he and Lois are at the park, he jumps on a woman breastfeeding her baby and greedily suckles on her, but is pulled off by Lois. One night, he then tries to milk Lois in her sleep. He pumps her breasts and succeeds, but spills and desperately tries licking it up. Stewie realizes how pathetic he is and accepts his weaning. He comes to Brian and informs that he is now off breast milk, but Lois has other plans. Lois allows Stewie to be breastfed again, thus delighting him.

This episode ends with a in memoriam to Don Knotts.

Production

This episode starts by depicting the game show Wheel of Fortune. When Brian is watching Malcolm in the Middle on television, a scene begins showing Lois screaming at sons Malcolm, Reese, and Dewey and husband Hal. Jane Kaczmarek was asked to do the voice as she was the original actor in the series; however, she refused. MacFarlane said that he gets a message that Kaczmarek wishes to portray that character as likable, and does not wish to jeopardize that. During that scene, Hal was voiced by Bryan Cranston, the actor from the series, who accepted the role. Seth MacFarlane comments that "this is the first real Quagmire story we've ever done." A scene was made of Stewie attending a meeting similar to those at Alcoholics Anonymous; however, the meeting was designed for those who are too addicted to breast milk. The format of Wheel of Fortune is somewhat similar to the layout of the modern-day program, but the scene also features several aspects which are now no longer broadcast, such as not automatically being given R, S, T, L, N, and E, and were featured in the 1980s.

Two scenes during this episode were censored for television broadcasting. When Quagmire meets Joan and invites her out on a date, Cleveland asks, "Is that a banana in your pocket, or an erection in your pocket?" Although this entire scene was not censored, Fox Broadcasting Company bleeped "erection", which, according to DVD commentary, made what Cleveland said sound worse than what was intended. The scene where Peter is promoting 'Crystal Pepsi' was shown only on the DVD, because it is prohibited to promote one product over another on television.

There is also a scene after the watermelon exploding trick where Meg was supposed to say "Fuck you, asshole! I'll kick your ass to hell!", but Fox also censored the line and was replaced by "I hate you! I hate you!" instead.

In addition to the regular cast, voice actor Adam Carolla, actor Stephan Cox, actor Bryan Cranston, actor Darrel Heath, actress Beth Littleford, actress Christy Carlson Romano, voice actress Nicole Sullivan, voice actor Fred Tatasciore, actor Alex Thomas, and game show host Alex Trebek guest starred in the episode. Recurring voice actors Ralph Garman, Mike Henry, writer Danny Smith, actress Jennifer Tilly, and writer John Viener made minor appearances in the episode. Recurring guest voice actors Patrick Warburton and Adam West made appearances in the episode as well.

Cultural references
In the opening scene of the episode, Peter is shown playing on the gameshow Wheel of Fortune, with hosts Pat Sajak and Vanna White also appearing. When Mayor West is playing as a contestant on Jeopardy!, he spells the name of the host, Alex Trebek, backwards (Kebert Xela), sending him back to the fifth dimension; this is a reference to when DC Comics supervillain and nemesis to Superman, Mister Mxyzptlk, is sent to the fifth dimension when someone makes him say his own name backwards. A Family Guy fan later did this in a real life episode of Jeopardy! 

When Peter and the children are flying through space and singing, this is a  reference to The Great Space Coaster. The two Asian men who meet Peter at the traffic lights when riding Joan's back speak in a very similar tone to Howard Cosell, a reference to the 1985 cult film Better Off Dead. 

When Quagmire fantasizes about being alone in the forest with Joan and speaking to her in Elvish, this is a reference to a scene from The Lord of the Rings; Quagmire goes on to imagine himself with Joan dancing dressed as the title characters from Beauty and the Beast, eating a plate of spaghetti similar to that shown in Lady and the Tramp, and flying on a magic carpet dressed as Aladdin and Princess Jasmine. They also fly through Baghdad, which is in ruins from the US/British invasion. 

Adam West's response to seeing the Statue of Liberty is taken from the original Planet of the Apes. Also, there is a scene where Brian watches Malcolm in the Middle. In the scene, Lois nags the boys so much that she will go on strike, so Hal ends up killing her with a refrigerator door and walks away blissfully with the boys. Twice during the episode Quagmire engraves his name with his nose much like Woody Woodpecker. In the end, he engraves "giggity giggity goo" in the same fashion.

Reception
Bob Sassone of TV Squad commented that "this episode had one of the more hysterical/disturbing images of this TV season: Lois flashing her breasts to Brian after giving Stewie his lunch." Michael Drucker of IGN noted that "the volume four episodes are easily funnier than the volume three ones", referring to the episode. Tom Eames of entertainment website Digital Spy placed the episode at number four on his listing of the best Family Guy episodes in order of "yukyukyuks" and described the episode as "dark and horrible, but brilliant." He added that the episode was "one of the first episodes to showcase just how ridiculously awful [Quagmire] could be."

References

External links

Family Guy (season 4) episodes
2006 American television episodes
Self-harm in fiction
Cultural depictions of Alec Baldwin